Pankaj Ghosh is an Indian politician  belonging to the Communist Party of India (Marxist). He is an ex member of West Bengal Legislative Assembly. He was elected as MLA of Bangaon Uttar in  1996 and 2001 by defeating Bhupendra nath Seth. Currently, Pankaj Ghosh is a Secretariat member of North 24 Pargana district committee of CPI(M)

Early life
Although Pankaj Ghosh started his career as a physics teacher at Gopalnagar Haripada Institute, he left his job shortly after and joined the CPI(M) as a full-time worker.

Political life

References

Living people
Communist Party of India (Marxist) politicians from West Bengal
Year of birth missing (living people)